The 1982 California Golden Bears football team represented the University of California, Berkeley during the 1982 NCAA Division I-A football season. For the Golden Bears this season is historically known for its last game – the 85th Big Game against Stanford on November 20, 1982. Specifically – The Play. A last-second kickoff return on which Cal was able to score a touchdown to win the game. Because of the context of the rivalry, the timing of the play and the unusual multi-lateral way that it occurred, it is recognized as one of the most memorable plays in college football history and among the most memorable in American sports.

Schedule

Roster

Not listed: Mariet Ford, Richard Rodgers

Game summaries

Stanford

1983 NFL Draft

References

California
California Golden Bears football seasons
California Golden Bears football